Philipp Blom (born 1970) is a German historian, novelist, journalist and translator.

Biography
Blom was born in Hamburg, Germany, grew up in Detmold, and studied in Vienna and Oxford. He holds a DPhil in Modern History from Oxford University. After living and working in London, Paris and Vienna he now lives in Los Angeles with his wife Veronica Buckley.

His historical works include To Have and To Hold, a history of collectors and collecting, and Encyclopédie (US edition: Enlightening the World), a history of the Encyclopaedia by Diderot and d'Alembert that sparked the Enlightenment in France. In The Vertigo Years, Blom argues that the break with the past that is often associated with the trauma of World War I actually had its roots in the years before the war from 1900–1914. Blom followed this with Fracture: Life and Culture in the West, 1918–1938, a cultural history of the interwar years.

Blom has published two novels: The Simmons Papers and Luxor (in German).

He has also published a guide to Austrian wines, The Wines of Austria, and an English translation of Geert Mak's Amsterdam (1999) (Blom has a Dutch mother and speaks the language as well).

As a journalist, Blom has written for the Times Literary Supplement, The Financial Times, The Independent, The Guardian, and the Sunday Telegraph in Britain, for various German-language publications (Neue Zürcher Zeitung, Frankfurter Allgemeine Zeitung, Die Zeit, Süddeutsche Zeitung, Financial Times Deutschland, Berliner Zeitung, Der Standard, Die Tageszeitung), and for Vrij Nederland in the Netherlands, as well as for other magazines and journals, the BBC, and German radio stations.  He currently hosts a live cultural programme, "Von Tag zu Tag", on station Ö1 on Austrian National Radio.

Recently, Blom has written the libretto for an opera, Soliman, a project with the composer Joost van Kerkhooven, and has provided translations for stage productions (The Producers for the Établissement Ronacher, and La Colombe for the Schönbrunn Theatre, Vienna).

Works
 In English
 
 
 
 
 
 
 
 

 In other languages

References

External links
Philipp Blom's website
Reviews of To Have and To Hold
Review of Encyclopedie, The Telegraph, 8 August 2004
Review of The Vertigo Years, The Guardian 13 September 2008
Link to Station Ö1 on Austrian National Radio
Philipp Blom at A M Heath & Co Literary Agents
On The Edge Adam Kirsch review of The Vertigo Years from The New York Review of Books
 Review of "Wicked Company" in www.theglobaldispatches.com
 Stories in which we believe, market, religion, science; lecture in Groningen (November 2012)

Living people
1970 births
German male non-fiction writers
21st-century German historians
Sustainability advocates